Vlčnov is a municipality and village in Uherské Hradiště District in the Zlín Region of the Czech Republic. It has about 2,900 inhabitants.

Geography
It lies in the Vizovice Highlands.

History
The first written mention of Vlčnov is from 1264. From 1506, it was part of the Uherský Brod estate. Together with Uherský Brod it was owned by the lords of Kunovice and from 1611 by the Kaunitz family.

Economy
Vlčnov is known for viticulture and wine production.

Culture

Vlčnov lies in the cultural region of Moravian Slovakia. Vlčnov is known for its folklore festival Ride of the Kings which is on the UNESCO Intangible Cultural Heritage List. Its uninterrupted tradition dates back to 1808. It is held every year at the end of May. The festival is known outside the Czech Republic for its traditional costumes and folklore music.

Sights

Northern part of Vlčnov called Kojiny is known for the vineyard buildings of folk architecture – búdy, which are above-ground cellars and presses. Vlčnov-Kojiny is protected by law as a village monument reservation.

A landmark of Vlčnov is the Church of St. James the Great, which is an early Gothic building from the 13th century.

Vlčnov is also known for Home Distillery Museum. It was opened in 2010 and is managed by the Museum of Moravian Slovakia in Uherské Hradiště.

References

External links

Tourist portal of Moravian Slovakia
Východní Slovácko microregion

Villages in Uherské Hradiště District
Moravian Slovakia